The Early Dynastic Period, also known as Archaic Period or the Thinite Period (from Thinis, the hometown of its rulers), is the era of ancient Egypt that immediately follows the unification of Upper and Lower Egypt in . It is generally taken to include the First Dynasty and the Second Dynasty, lasting from the end of the archaeological culture of Naqada III until , or the beginning of the Old Kingdom. With the First Dynasty, the Egyptian capital moved from Thinis to Memphis, with the unified land being ruled by an Egyptian god-king. In the south, Abydos remained the major centre of ancient Egyptian religion; the hallmarks of ancient Egyptian civilization, such as Egyptian art, Egyptian architecture, and many aspects of Egyptian religion, took shape during the Early Dynastic Period.

Before the unification of Egypt, the land was settled with autonomous villages. With the early dynasties, and for much of Egypt's history thereafter, the country came to be known as "The Two Lands" (referencing Upper and Lower Egypt). The pharaohs established a national administration and appointed royal governors, and buildings of the central government were typically open-air temples constructed of wood or sandstone. The earliest Egyptian hieroglyphs appear just before this period, though little is known of the spoken language that they represent.

Cultural evolution

By about 3600 BC, Neolithic Egyptian societies along the Nile had based their culture on the raising of crops and the domestication of animals.  Shortly after 3600 BC Egyptian society began to grow and advance rapidly toward refined civilization. A new and distinctive pottery, which was related to the pottery in the Southern Levant, appeared during this time. Extensive use of copper became common during this period. The Mesopotamian process of sun-dried bricks, and architectural building principles—including the use of the arch and recessed walls for decorative effect—became popular.

Concurrent with these cultural advances, a process of unification of the societies and towns of the upper Nile River, or Upper Egypt, occurred. At the same time, the societies of the Nile Delta, or Lower Egypt also underwent a unification process. Warfare between Upper and Lower Egypt occurred often. During his reign in Upper Egypt, King Narmer defeated his enemies on the Delta and merged both the Kingdom of Upper and Lower Egypt under his single rule. Narmer is shown on palettes wearing the double crown, composed of the lotus flower representing Upper Egypt and the papyrus reed representing Lower Egypt - a sign of the unified rule of both parts of Egypt which was followed by all succeeding rulers. In mythology, the unification of Egypt is portrayed as the falcon-god, called Horus and identified with Lower Egypt, as conquering and subduing the god Set, who was identified with Upper Egypt. Divine kingship, which would persist in Egypt for the next three millennia, was firmly established as the basis of Egypt's government.  The unification of societies along the Nile has also been linked to the end of the African humid period.

Funeral practices for the peasants would have been the same as in predynastic times, but the rich demanded something more. Thus, the Egyptians began construction of the mastabas which became models for the later Old Kingdom constructions such as the step pyramid. Cereal agriculture and centralization contributed to the success of the state for the next 800 years.

It seems certain that Egypt became unified as a cultural and economic domain long before its first king ascended to the throne in the lower Egyptian city of Memphis. Political unification proceeded gradually, perhaps over a period of a few centuries, as local districts established trading networks and as the ability of their governments to organize agriculture labor on a larger scale increased. Divine kingship may also have gained spiritual momentum as the cults of gods like Horus, Set and Neith associated with living representatives became widespread in the country.

It was also during this period that the Egyptian writing system was further developed. Initially, Egyptian writing had been composed primarily of a few symbols denoting amounts of various substances. By the end of the 3rd dynasty it had been expanded to include more than 200 symbols, both phonograms and ideograms.

First Pharaoh

According to Manetho, the first monarch of the unified Upper and Lower Egypt was Menes, who is now identified with Narmer. Indeed, Narmer is the earliest recorded First Dynasty monarch: he appears first on the necropolis seal impressions of Den and Qa'a. This shows that Narmer was recognized by the first dynasty kings as an important founding figure. Narmer is also the earliest king associated to the symbols of power over the two lands (see in particular the Narmer Palette, a votive cosmetic palette showing Narmer wearing the crowns of Upper and Lower Egypt) and may therefore be the first king to achieve the unification. Consequently, the current consensus is that "Menes" and "Narmer" refer to the same person. Alternative theories hold that Narmer was the final king of the Naqada III period and Hor-Aha is to be identified with "Menes".

Egyptians in Canaan and Nubia
Egyptian settlement and colonisation is attested from about 3200 BC onward all over the area of southern Canaan with almost every type of artifact: architecture (fortifications, embankments and buildings), pottery, vessels, tools, weapons, seals, etc. 20 serekhs attributed to Narmer — the first ruler of the Early Dynastic Period — have been found in Canaan. There is also evidence of Egyptian settlement and occupation in lower Nubia after the Nubian A-Group culture came to an end. By the Early Dynastic Period, the Egyptian state had likely imposed its authority as far north as modern Tel Aviv and as far south as the second cataract in Nubia.

References

Further reading

External links
Narmer Palette

States and territories established in the 4th millennium BC
States and territories disestablished in the 3rd millennium BC
Early Dynastic Period of Egypt
Dynasties of ancient Egypt
32nd century BC
27th century BC
4th millennium BC in Egypt
3rd millennium BC in Egypt

pl:Władcy Egiptu#Okres wczesnodynastyczny (archaiczny) – ok. 3150–2686 roku p.n.e.